The jurisdiction of England and Wales does not have a Criminal Code though such an instrument has been often recommended and attempted. , the Law Commission is again working on the Code.

History
1818 - Parliament petitions the Prince Regent for a Law Commission to consolidate English statute law.
1831 - Commission established to enquire into the possibility of a criminal code. The commission reports in 1835 and there are seven more reports over the next decade. A Criminal Law Code Bill is introduced, referred to a Select committee and then dropped.
1879 - A Royal Commission under Colin Blackburn, Baron Blackburn recommends and drafts a code.
1882 - Since 1844 there had been eight unsuccessful attempts to enact a code.
1965 - The Law Commission of England and Wales is established with a remit to review the law of England and Wales:

— A Criminal Code team is set up including academic lawyer Professor Sir John Cyril Smith, the outstanding criminal lawyer of his time.
1985 - Draft code published.
1989 - Draft code revised and expanded.
2002 - Government reiterates its intention to proceed with a code.

Arguments for a Code
Attorney-General Sir John Holker said:

Sir John Smith was, in general an opponent of legal codes but said:

References

Bibliography

 
Lord Bingham of Cornhill, Lord Chief Justice of England (1998) "Speech at Dinner for HM Judges", The Mansion House, London, 22 July

External links
Law Commission project page

Legal history of England
Criminal codes
English criminal law